Jorge Prieto Echaurren (1873, Santiago – 1953) was a Chilean lawyer and politician.

Education and early career
He studied at the College of the Sacred Hearts of Santiago, and the University of Chile, where he graduated as a lawyer on December 20, 1898. He practiced in the capital, specializing in criminal cases.

References 

1873 births
1953 deaths
Politicians from Santiago
Chilean people of Spanish descent
Liberal Democratic Party (Chile, 1893) politicians
Chilean Ministers of Justice
Deputies of the XXX Legislative Period of the National Congress of Chile
Deputies of the XXXI Legislative Period of the National Congress of Chile
Deputies of the XXXII Legislative Period of the National Congress of Chile
University of Chile alumni
20th-century Chilean lawyers